Andrés Didyer Catalán Guemes (born 20 August 2000) is a Mexican professional footballer who plays as a defender.

Career statistics

Club

Honours
Mexico U17
CONCACAF U-17 Championship: 2017

References

2000 births
Living people
Mexico youth international footballers
Association football defenders
Atlético Morelia players
Liga Premier de México players
Liga MX players
Sportspeople from Cuernavaca
Footballers from Morelos
Mexican footballers